John Bruce Williamson KC (1859–1938) was a British barrister and historical author.

Life
Williamson was born on 28 January 1859. The son of John Williamson of Glasgow, he matriculated at Balliol College, Oxford on 29 January 1881, graduating B.A. in 1885.

In 1887 Williamson was called to the bar at the Middle Temple. He was appointed secretary to the University of Durham Commissioners constituted under the University of Durham Act 1908 by warrant under the royal sign manual dated 27 October 1908. He was elected to serve on the General Council of the Bar in February 1911 and again in 1913. He became a bencher of the Middle Temple in 1925.

Williamson died on 7 July 1938. The National Portrait Gallery has a photograph of him taken in 1936 by Olive Edis.

Works
Williamson was the author of:
The Foreign Commerce of England Under the Tudors: The Stanhope Essay for 1883 (B H Blackwell, Oxford, 1883)
The Law of Licensing in England (1st Ed: 1898, 2nd Ed: 1902, 3rd Ed: 1905, 4th Ed: 1911). Sometimes called Williamson's Law of Licensing. The first three editions were published by William Clowes & Sons Limited, the fourth was published by Stevens & Sons (Limited). The "standard book" of its day on its subject.
The Palatine Court of Durham Act, 1889 (Beavis, Stewart & Co; Newcastle; 1890) Also called Bruce Williamson on Palatine Court. 
Memorials of John Bruce, Schoolmaster in Newcastle upon Tyne and of Mary Bruce, His Wife (Newcastle, 1903) (aka Memorials of John and Mary Bruce; Memorials of John Bruce)
The History of the Temple, London, from the institution of the order of the Knights of the Temple to the close of the Stuart period (J Murray, London, 1st Ed: 1924, 2nd Ed: 1925; both editions reprinted by Gaunt, Holmes Beach, 1998) Baker calls this book "excellent" 
Roll of Honour (1925)
Drawings of the Inns of Court and Chancery made probably in the first half of the Eighteenth Century (London Topographical Society, Publication No 59, 1928)
Middle Temple Hall: Notes upon its History (Printed for Society of the Middle Temple by Chancery Lane Press, London, 1st Ed: 1928, 2nd revised Ed: 1934)
Catalogue of Silver Plate: The property of the Hon. Society of the Middle Temple (Bonner, London, 1930) Also known as "Silver plate of the Middle Temple", which appears on the cover.
The Practice of the Law in England (London, 1930)
Catalogue of the Paintings and Engravings in the Possession of the Hon. Society of the Middle Temple (Society of the Middle Temple, London, 1931)
Notes on the Middle Temple in the Nineteenth Century, chiefly with reference to the Buildings of the Inn (Bonner & Co, London, 1936)
Sir Walter Raleigh and His Trial (Pitman, London, 1936) Autumn Reader of the Middle Temple (Lector Autumnalis) for 1935.
Volume 1 of the Second Edition of "The Middle Temple Bench Book" (1937)

Williamson was joint author with Roger William Wallace QC of:
The Law and Practice Relating to Letters Patent for Inventions (Wallace and Williams on Patents for Inventions) (W Clowes and Sons Limited, 1900) Reprinted in "nineteenth century legal treatises" microform series by Research Publications, Woodbridge.

References
"Obituary" (1938) 186 Law Times 58; see also p 209 Google Books
"Obituary" (1938) 86 Law Journal 53; see also p 89 Google Books
"Obituary" (1938) 82 Solicitors Journal 586 Google Books
"Obituary" (1938) 102 Justice of the Peace and Local Government Review 468 Google Books
Sir Ivo d'Oyle Elliot. "Williamson, John Bruce". The Balliol College Register. Second Edition. Printed by John Johnson at the University Press. 1934. p 129. Google Books
Edward Hilliard. "Williamson, John Bruce". The Balliol College Register 1832–1914. Printed for by H Hart at the University Press. Page 371.  Google Books
Joseph Foster. "Williamson, John Bruce". Oxford Men and their Colleges. James Parker & Co. London and Oxford. 1893. Page 659
(1887) 31 Solicitors' Journal and Reporter 206 Google Books (call to the bar)
Royal Blue Book: Court and Parliamentary Guide. January 1908. Page 1495. Google Books
Edward Lindsay Carson Mullins. Guide to the Historical and Archaeological Publications of Societies in England and Wales, 1901–1933. Institute of Historical Research, University of London. Athlone Press. 1968. Article 3135 at p 241. Also pp 654 and 848. Google Books
Art and Architecture Book Guide: 1974. G K Hall & Co. Article 2474 at p 170 and p 353. Google Books
(1965) 3 Selden Society, Supplementary Series 28 Google Books
Williamson, John Bruce 1859-. WorldCat Identities.
Walter Cecil Richardson. A History of the Inns of Court: With Special Reference to the Period of the Renaissance. Claitor's Publishing Division. 1975. p 55 & 56. Google Books

Members of the Middle Temple
Alumni of Balliol College, Oxford
1859 births
1938 deaths